Heroes National Stadium is a multi-purpose stadium in Lusaka, Lusaka Province, Zambia. It is currently used mostly for football matches and hosts the home matches of the Zambia national football team. The stadium holds 60,000 spectators. It opened in 2014. The name of the stadium refers to the 1993 Zambia national football team air disaster which took the lives of most of its national football team.

History
Upon completion of construction in 2013, it was originally named the Gabon Disaster Heroes National Stadium because of this, but the ruling Patriotic Front government was pressured to change the name by the populace.

On 7 July 2021, a state funeral of former President Kenneth Kaunda was held at the National Heroes Stadium.

Geography

The stadium's location is in the northern suburbs of Lusaka, Lusaka Province (Zambia's Capital City) on the Great North Road (T2 Road). 

The Heroes National Stadium is located right next to where the refurbished Independence Stadium and the Heroes Acres Memorial where the players who died in the Gabon air disaster in 1993 are buried.

References

Buildings and structures in Lusaka
Football venues in Zambia
Multi-purpose stadiums in Zambia